Banksia obtusa, commonly known as shining honeypot, is a species of shrub that is endemic to the south-west of Western Australia. It has underground stems, linear pinnatifid leaves with triangular lobes on each side, cream-coloured to yellow flowers in heads of up to seventy, surrounded by dark reddish bracts and egg-shaped follicles.

Description
Banksia obtusa is a shrub with triangular, underground stems but does not form a lignotuber. There are between thirty and sixty triangular lobes on each side of the leaves.

Taxonomy and naming
This species was first formally described in 1810 by Robert Brown who gave it the name Dryandra obtusa and published the description in Transactions of the Linnean Society of London. The specific epithet (obtusa) is from a Latin word meaning "blunt", referring either to the leaves or the leaf lobes.

In 2007 Austin Mast and Kevin Thiele transferred all dryandras to the genus Banksia and renamed this species Banksia obtusa.

Distribution and habitat
Shining honeypot grows in kwongan and mallee shrubland in near-coastal areas between the Fitzgerald River National Park and the Cape Arid National Park.

Conservation status
This banksia is classified as "not threatened" by the Western Australian Government Department of Parks and Wildlife.

References

 

obtusa
Endemic flora of Western Australia
Plants described in 1810
Taxa named by Robert Brown (botanist, born 1773)